Fransiskus Xaverius Mumpo (born 12 September 1990) is an Indonesian footballer who plays for Perseru Serui in Liga 1 as a midfielder or striker.

References

External links
Fransiskus Mumpo official website Persma 

1990 births
Living people
PSP Padang players
Persiwa Wamena players
Badak Lampung F.C. players
Indonesian footballers
Association football midfielders
Association football forwards